Augustine Creek may refer to:

 Augustine Creek (Delaware Bay tributary), in Delaware
 Saint Augustine Creek, a tributary of the Savannah River, in Georgia